Love in the Present Tense is a novel by Catherine Ryan Hyde, released in 2006.

Plot
The story mainly concerns Mitch, who is, at the start, a 25 year old internet entrepreneur, and Leonard, initially a 5-year-old boy. Leonard's mother leaves him with Mitch each day, but one day she departs, never to return. The story is told from the perspectives of these two protagonists, at various parts of their lives (together with a few chapters contributed by Leonard's mother: Pearl). The story deals with various aspects and types of love.

References

2006 American novels
Random House books
Black Swan (imprint) books